The year 2008 is the 1st year in the history of World Victory Road, a mixed martial arts promotion based in Japan. In 2008 World Victory Road held 6 events beginning with, World Victory Road Presents: Sengoku Vanguard.

Events list

World Victory Road Presents: Sengoku First Battle

World Victory Road Presents: Sengoku First Battle was an event held on March 5, 2008 at the Yoyogi National Gymnasium in Tokyo, Japan.

Results

World Victory Road Presents: Sengoku 2

World Victory Road Presents: Sengoku 2 was an event held on May 18, 2008 at the Ariake Coliseum in Tokyo, Japan.

Results

World Victory Road Presents: Sengoku 3

World Victory Road Presents: Sengoku 3 was an event held on June 8, 2008 at the Saitama Super Arena in Saitama City, Japan.

Results

World Victory Road Presents: Sengoku 4

World Victory Road Presents: Sengoku 4 was an event held on September 24, 2008 at the Saitama Super Arena in Saitama City, Japan.

Results

World Victory Road Presents: Sengoku 5

World Victory Road Presents: Sengoku 5 was an event held on September 28, 2008 at the Yoyogi National Gymnasium in Tokyo, Japan.

Results

World Victory Road Presents: Sengoku 6

World Victory Road Presents: Sengoku 6 was an event held on November 1, 2008 at the Saitama Super Arena in Saitama City, Japan.

Results

See also 
 World Victory Road

References

World Victory Road events
2008 in mixed martial arts